Gorka is a rural locality (a village) in Krasavinskoye Rural Settlement, Velikoustyugsky District, Vologda Oblast, Russia. The population was 14 as of 2002.

Geography 
The distance to Veliky Ustyug is 24 km.

References 

Rural localities in Velikoustyugsky District